Kamar Sabz (also Romanized as Kamar-e Sabz; also known as Kamarsuz and Kamar Boz) is a village in Qaleh Zari Rural District, Jolgeh-e Mazhan District, Khusf County, South Khorasan Province, Iran. At the 2006 census, its population was 36, in 16 families.

References 

Populated places in Khusf County